The SS Bakio was a British-built steamship operated by the Spanish shipping company Naviera Sota y Aznar. The ship was built in 1904 and sunk on 30 April 1916 by German U-boat , the same U-boat that sank the RMS Lusitania on 7 May 1915.

Career 

The SS Bakio was built by the Campbeltown Shipbuilding Company in 1904 and sold to the Spanish shipping company Naviera Sota y Aznar, based in Bilbao. The ship was last spotted on 29 April 1916 off the coast of Peniche, Portugal. The ship was traveling from Sagunto, Spain, to Montreal, Canada, carrying a cargo of iron ore. The ship was sunk on 30 April 1916 by German U-boat  in the Atlantic Ocean after being struck by torpedoes. The site of the wreck has never been located.

The sinking of the SS Bakio by SM U-20 seems to contradict the U-boat's sinking of the French schooner  the next day, 1 May 1916, south of Ireland.

References

External links 

Ships hit by U 20

1904 ships
World War I shipwrecks in the Atlantic Ocean
Maritime incidents in 1916